Ignacio Ulloa Rubio (born in Madrid in 1967) is a Spanish Judge and a member of the European General Court.

He studied in Madrid's (Complutense University). He was the Spanish's Secretary of State of Security between 2011 and 2013.
He can speak Spanish, French, English, and has knowledge of German and Arabic. He is married and has two children.

References 

Living people
20th-century Spanish judges
1967 births
General Court (European Union) judges
Complutense University of Madrid alumni
People from Madrid
Spanish judges of international courts and tribunals
Spanish officials of the European Union
Secretaries of State of Spain
21st-century Spanish judges